Nidaros Roller Derby (NRD) is a women's flat track flat-track roller derby league based in Trondheim, Norway. Founded in 2010, Nidaros Roller Derby is a member of the Women's Flat Track Derby Association (WFTDA).

History
Nidaros was the first roller derby league in Norway, founded in August 2010, and had more than thirty skaters by November.  By late 2011, it was one of three roller derby leagues in Norway, and was a finalist in the national "Klubben i mitt hjerte" (club in my heart) competition.

In October 2012, Nidaros was accepted as a member of the Women's Flat Track Derby Association Apprentice Programme, and it became a full WFTDA member in September 2013. Nidaros has two teams, an A and a B team, which play teams from other leagues.

WFTDA competition
In 2016, Nidaros became the first team from Norway to qualify for WFTDA Playoffs, placed in the Division 2 Playoff in Lansing, Michigan. At Lansing, Nidaros lost their first two games to Wasatch Roller Derby (Salt Lake City, Utah) and Tri-City Roller Derby (Kitchener, Ontario), before defeating Grand Raggidy Roller Girls (Grand Rapids, Michigan) 168-137 to finish in ninth place.

Rankings

References

Sport in Trondheim
Roller derby leagues established in 2010
Roller derby leagues
Roller derby in Norway
2010 establishments in Norway